Cyamops fiji is a species of fly.

References

fiji
Insects described in 2000